Mohammad Zaki Kushki (also Romanized as Moḥammad Zakī Kūshkī; also known as Chāh Shūreh-ye Soflá) is a village in Tarhan-e Gharbi Rural District, Tarhan District, Kuhdasht County, Lorestan Province, Iran. At the 2006 census, its population was 175, in 32 families.

References 

Towns and villages in Kuhdasht County